Oscar Salvador Romero (born October 8, 1996) is an American professional soccer player who most recently played as a midfielder for North Texas SC in USL League One.

References

External links
 
 Oscar Romero at FC Dallas
 

1996 births
Living people
American soccer players
Association football midfielders
Inter Playa del Carmen players
Liga Premier de México players
North Texas SC players
Soccer players from Florida
USL League One players
Soccer players from Dallas